Gregory Alan Hill (born October 27, 1963 in Santa Ana, California) is an American former professional bicycle motocross (BMX) racer whose prime competitive years were from 1977 to 1989. He retired from the top competitive "AA" pro circuit after the 1998 season.

He was known to be very outspoken, a rider who had a bit of a temper on the track, and his nicknames were "The Machine" and "The Businessman", for his very serious, focused attitude toward racing even as a 14-year-old amateur, and also his willingness to speak his mind including being critical of sanctioning bodies and their policies and rules. "The Businessman" moniker in particular was coined by Bob Osborn, owner and editor of Bicycle Motocross Action magazine. Greg personally boycotted the ABA for almost a full season in 1980 beginning with the Winternationals and ending with the Vans 5000 Pro Spectacular. He later led an informal pro boycott with numerous respected top pros against the ABA in 1983 over the method of how the ABA national number one was decided. Hill was also involved in a number of business ventures, such as motivational and how to books and video tapes; running a short lived BMX bicycle company, Greg Hill Products (GHP) during the 1980s which he later revived in the early 1990s and is still going strong, and teaching seminars instructing children on how to race. These are but a few examples of the drive to promote himself and BMX in the public eye.

He is the brother in law of Stu Thomsen, who married Hill's sister, Tanya, in 1979. Greg Hill's first son, Gregory Jonathan Hill, was born five hours after his father won the ESPN Pro Spectacular Series.

Racing career milestones

Started racing: April 1974 at the Escape Country track in Trabuco Canyon, California.  It was at the urging of a friend, Tim Galego, a then neighbor of his He was 10 years old. ||
Sanctioning body: National Bicycle Association (NBA) 
Home sanctioning body district(s): National Bicycle Association (NBA) District "X" (Southern California/Los Angeles) (1975–1981);
First race bike:  Schwinn "Apple Crate"  
First race result: Fifth Place 10 Novice.  
Greg and Liz were married on January 7, 1994) at the Western Sports-A-rama track in Orange, California.  
First sponsor: Pedals Ready Pro Shop/GT* in 1976. His father owned the bicycle shop as well as ran the Western Sports-A-rama track. 
First national win: In 12 Novice at the National Bicycle Association (NBA) Winter Nationals in Scottsdale, Arizona on April 17, 1976.<ref>Bicycle Motocross News"' May 1976 Vol.3 No.5 p. 14</ref> 
Turned professional: At the age of 14 on March 28, 1978 at the NBA Super Nationals.
|*Retired:  He retired from frontline Senior pro (AA) competition in 1998 at the age of 35. However, like it seems with the majority of BMX racers they can't stay away from it. After a four-year lay off Greg Hill started racing in ABA's Vet pro class at the age of 40 in 2004.
The founder of GT Bicycles, Gary Turner, was making bicycle frames in his garage for the bike shop race team.
At the time there was no separate pro class for pros due to the relatively small number of pros. They raced with the 16 Experts, making it a Pro/Am class essentially. This is why during the early years of the pro division the national number one racer of a sanctioning body could be either an amateur or professional. This practice continued until the NBA's 1979 season in which the pros earned separate pro points and a separate pro plate from the amateurs. The NBL and ABA followed suit a year later.

Career factory and large bicycle shop sponsors

This listing only denotes the racer's primary sponsors. At any given time a racer could have numerous co-sponsors. Primary sponsorships can be verified by BMX press coverage and sponsor's advertisements at the time in question. When possible exact dates are used.

Amateur
 Pedals Ready Pro Shop/Gary Turner (GT): Early 1976-April 1976
 Webco Inc., Pedal-cross Speciaties: April 1976-Late 1976
 FMF (Flying Machine Factory): Late 1976-October 1977. He discontinued association with FMF in October 1977 and created Scot Enterprises Racing (SER).
 SE Racing (formerly Scot Enterprises Racing Division, now called Sports Engineering, Inc.): October 1977-Late February 1978.
 Schwinn Bicycle Company: Late February 1978-November 1978. Mr Hill turned pro on with this sponsor.

Professional
 Schwinn Bicycle Company: Late February 1978-November 1978.
 Redline Engineering: November 1978-Mid June 1980. Left under poor terms.  Greg Hill maintained that Redline did not meet his salary requirements to renew the contract and Redline told him directly that he wasn't worth it.  Redline maintained that Hill had a deal with GT Racing already set up building a frame* before he quit, implying that he was not bargaining in good faith. At this time Greg Hill was developing a reputation as someone who jumps from sponsor to sponsor at little provocation or reason.

*GT would be a co-sponsor when he raced with Shimano. The frame fork and handlebars were of GT manufacture while Shimano provided the major components such as the caliper brakes pedals, cranks, chainwheels, sprockets etc.

Shimano Sales Corporation: Mid June 1980-July 1980. Fellow pro racer Bobby Encinas had personally recruited Greg Hill onto the Shimano racing team. Shimano apparently ended direct sponsorship of Greg Hill by the time of the Lansing, Michigan American Bicycle Association (ABA) national in the summer of 1980. According to the September 1980 issue of Bicycle Motocross Action magazine (p. 56) Shimano Sales believed that Hill breached his contract with Redline Engineering in some way and they withdrew their sponsorship of him.
Bobby Encinas: July 1980-Mid December 1980. Apparently Bobby Encinas, who was in virtual semi-retirement by this time but making promotional tours and numerous interviews for television and magazines personally sponsored Greg Hill starting in July 1980. It was a strange situation to some observers. To add to the confusion Greg Hill still raced in Shimano livery.
Mongoose (BMX Products): Mid December 1980-September 30, 1981. Left under bad circumstances. Greg Hill claimed that Mongoose did not send him to a certain number of nationals including foreign ones, that they promised they would. According to Greg, Mongoose only paid Mr. Hill's way to only six. Mongoose's side of the story is that they sent Greg to seventeen nationals, paying for entry fees, motel and hotel cost and air fair for the twelve of the seventeen nationals he was flown to. Further, a tour of England was discussed but declined due to it interfering with Mr. Hill's vacation.
GT (Gary Turner) Racing: October 1, 1981 – August 28, 1983. The Huffy Global race was Hill's last race for GT. He left under bad circumstances under a contract dispute when he left GT Racing one week before the 1983 NBL Grand Nationals instead of at the end of the year to ride for his own company Greg Hill Products (GHP). Mr. Hill felt that GT was treating him poorly and he lacked motivation to win for them. However, Greg Hill would later sign with Robinson Racing, a bicycle company owned and operated by Richard Long, who also founded and owned GT Racing, indicating any problems between Mr. Hill and GT were patched up.
CyclePro/GHP (Greg Hill Products): September 1, 1983-December 1984. This was a BMX bicycle company owned by Greg Hill from mid-1983 to July 1986 when it ceased operations (see Redline Engineering). Greg Hill briefly restarted it in 1992 and again in 2005. After a year CyclePro withdrew from partnership with GHP.
GHP: January 1985-December 31, 1985
Redline Engineering: January 1, 1986-November 9,BMX Action February 1987 Vol.12 No.2 p. 22 1986. Due to financial difficulties GHP could no longer field a factory team, not even Greg Hill himself who was paying his way to races from his own winnings and salary. As part of the deal with Redline, Greg Hill had to divest himself from GHP. GHP also could not use Greg Hill's name in any promotional advertising or any other association, which of course included the name of the company. His father ran the company under a new name for the remainder of its existence. This is the same terms that drove Pete Loncarevich from Scot Enterprises Racing (SER), when SE Racing wanted Pete Loncarevich's father to shut down Loncarevich Racing Products (LRP), which did not make bicycles or bicycle frames and forks, but other BMX accessories. Pete Loncarevich later had to accept these terms when he signed with Custom Works (CW). Companies do not want to potentially aid rivals in the same business as they are, and Greg Hill Products were clearly competitors that marketed its own line of complete bicycles and major components like frames, forks and handle bars. GHP was finally shut down in July 1986 some six months after Greg Hill signed with Redline. He was able to revive Greg Hill Products in 1992 after going into semi-retirement from racing and devote more time to it.
Robinson Racing Products: November 10, 1986 – December 1, 1991. Hill briefly considered quitting racing after Redline dropped him until Robinson Racing signed him. In approximately August 1986 GT Racing purchase Robinson Racing Products.
Balance/ProForx/ODI/Answer: Mid 1993-September 1994. He ran Answer Product's BMX division for approximately a year. In 1994, he reclassified himself back up to "AA" Pro.
Redline Bicycles: September 1994-December 1998. This was the third association with Redline. He was also the team manager at this time. Greg Hill would return to Redline for a fourth time, this time in a non racing capacity in Late September 1999 driving the Redline factory truck nationals, and promoting his company Sinister Steering Systems.
Sinister/Marzocchi: 1999-July 2000 After leaving Redline he devoted full attention to his company Sinister, which would later be brought by Marzocchi. Greg Hill would stay on for a time as Product Development and Brand Manager.
Kona BMX: August 1, 2000 – December 21, 2000. Greg Hill declared his leaving of the BMX world in its entirety after his stint with Kona. However, it would be a short retirement.
Haro Designs: 2003-2004
GHP Factory Racing 2005–Present. Greg Hill re-opened the doors to GHP along with the help of Alan Worley (Bicycle City).

*Pros could race with the Expert amateurs at the time, there was a separate Pro class but not a separate Pro No.1 title.
‡Last known date of sponsorship but not necessarily the actual last date.

Career bicycle motocross titles

Note: Listed are District, State/Provincial/Department, Regional, National, and International titles in italics. "Defunct" refers to the fact of that sanctioning body in question no longer existing at the start of the racer's career or at that stage of his/her career. Depending on point totals of individual racers, winners of Grand Nationals do not necessarily win National titles. Series and one off Championships are also listed in block.

Amateur

National Bicycle Association (NBA)1975/76 Local No.1 12 Expert1976 12 Novice Winternational Series Champion1976 National No.1 13 Expert1977 13 Expert District Championships Champion.1977 National No.1 14 Expert*1978 National No.1 15 Expert*1979 National No.1 Expert*1981 National No.1 16 Expert*

National Bicycle League (NBL)
None
United Bicycle Racers (UBR)
1980 14 & Over Cruiser Grand National Champion*
American Bicycle Association (ABA)
None

*Pros could and did race in the 16 Expert and other amateur classes during this era in the NBA and UBR even if there was a separate pro class and earn amateur titles as well. This was allowed because the professional class was still relatively small at the time.

Professional
1979 NBA National # 1 Champion
National Bicycle Association (NBA)
1980 Race of Champions Pro winner.*
1981 Pro Money and Senior Open Grandnational Champion (double)

*This was not a national no.1 plate title but a special series of races.

National Bicycle League (NBL)
1981 Pro National No.3
1983 ESPN Pro Spectacular Series No. 1 Champion (NBL sanctioned). He won a Ford Mustang GL sports car.
1985 Pro Cruiser Grandnational Champion1985 National No.1 Pro & Pro Cruiser National No.1
1986 National No.3 Pro
1986 National No.1 Pro Cruiser
1988 National No.1 Pro
1989 National No.2 Pro
United Bicycle Racers (UBR)

American Bicycle Association (ABA)
1979 & 1989 National No.2 pro
1982 Jag Pro World Champion (ABA sanctioned)
1996 Veteran Pro World Cup Champion

United States Bicycle Motocross Association (USBA)
1985 National No.1 Pro.
1985, 1986 National No.1 Pro Cruiser.

International Bicycle Motocross Federation (IBMXF)
1981 20" Pro International Champion.
1982 20" Pro World Champion.
1989 20" Pro Third Place World Champion.

BMX product lines
In the summer of 1983 Greg Hill started his own BMX bicycle company,
Greg Hill Products (GHP) that made frames and forks and later complete Bicycles. In the early days, Cycle Pro manufactured the Hill designed components and were distributed by them. Later on, GHP products were built by VDC. Hill was quoted in the November 1983 issue of Super BMX magazine as to why he made the switch from GT Racing said that he wanted "...to move on, do my own thing." The company would last in its original incarnation from 1983 to 1986 with a second life from 1991 to 1993 and presently from 2005 to the present.
1984 CyclePro/Greg Hill Products Greg Hill Replica Signature Model bicycle.
Product Evaluations
BMX Plus! November 1984 Vol.7 No.11 p. 57 Test Article.
BMX Action December 1984 Vol.9 No.12 p. 60 Test Article.

Other rider owned bicycle companies
Scot Breithaupt: SE Racing (1976–1999) SE Racing was sold to a Taiwanese firm.
Jeff Utterback: GJS Racing (with his father George and his brother Scott).
Bob Haro: (freestyler) 1979–Present Haro was sold to West Coast Cycles (Cycle Pro) in December 1986 
Billy Farrell: Hyper Bicycles, 1983–1985 (Farrell was killed in an automobile accident in the Fall of 1985 and the company shut down soon after)
Chris Moeller: S&M (Scott & Moeller) Bicycles (racer/dirt jumper) with Greg Scott Mid 1987–Present 
Tommy Brackens: Brackens Racing Products 1988-Late 1994 Tommy sold his company to Power Source/Roost in Late 1994 
Rick Moliternio: Standard Bykes (racer/freestyler) with fellow freestylers William Nitschke and Kurt Schmidt. 1991–Present.
Mat Hoffman: Hoffman Bikes (freestyler)
Craig Reynolds: Reynolds Racing Mid 1993-September 1998
Harry Leary: Dirtwerx

Notable accolades
He is the youngest winner of a national level NBA trophy dash that involved pros (amateurs and pros could race in the same trophy dash race at the time) on March 28, 1978 at the NBA Supernationals, defeating such veteran and older professional luminaries as Perry Kramer, Robby Rupe and Jeff Ruminer at the age of 14 years. It is a record that will never be broken since, beginning in 1980, an amateur has to be the age of 16 to turn pro by all sanctioning bodies, in addition that the NBA ceased existing as an independent sanctioning body at the end of the 1981 season with its merger with the NBL.
He is the last Pro Class Grand National Champion of the National Bicycle Motocross Association (NBmxA) Grand National and the last winner of any NBmxA national, winning both the Pro Money and Senior Open classes of the 1981 NBmxA Grand National in Long Beach, California in December 1981. The NBmxA (née National Bicycle Association) merged with the National Bicycle League (NBL) in January 1982. Scott Clark was the last NBmxA/NBA National Number One Pro in 1981.

He is a four-time BMX Action Number One Racer Award (NORA) Cup winner:
1983 with 2586 votes out of 6761 cast or 38.25% of the Vote. He also received a check of US$500 from BMX Action magazine.*
1984 with 2237 votes out of 8922** cast or 25.1% of the Vote. His winnings were a Billiard Olympic 320 lb weight set and a Marcy Monster incline bench.
1985 with 1184 votes out of 4638** cast or 25.53% of the Vote. He won a Weider 310 lb weight set and a Marcy Olympic weight bench.
1989 with 22% of the Vote (Number of individual and total votes cast not given).
Greg Hill is a 1990 ABA Hall of Fame Inductee and is also a 2005 United States Bicycling Hall of Fame Inductee.

*In the March 1983 issue of BMX Action he is listed as the 1982 winner. The next year, 1984, the date of the winner was changed from the year the votes were cast and actually counted to when the winner was presented to the public, by this time in the March issue. This Wikipedia listing of Greg Hill's string of NORA wins reflects that, including his first win under the old system. Therefore, under new system Greg Hill won his first NORA Cup in 1983, when his win was officially made to the public in the March 1983 BMX Action, not when the votes were counted in 1982.
**Tallied from the total votes the top ten Pros received.

Significant injuries
Hyper-Extended his left knee in a collision with Tommy Brackens in an NBL national held in Memphis, Tennessee in March 1983. Laid up for approximately a month.
Broken collar bone and torn ear in January 1984. Laid up for three months.
Injury filled 1987. Contusion on leg. Laid up two months; injured shoulder in mid summer; Sprained ankle in August.
Suffered a dislocated shoulder during the third main at the ABA Grandnationals on December 1, 1990 in Oklahoma City, Oklahoma. He was laid up until the ABA Lonestar Nationals in Austin, Texas on January 26, 1991. However, he re-injured the shoulder in Austin leading to the belief by some that he came back too soon. Undergoing physical therapy he was laid up until the ABA Supernationals in El Paso, Texas on the weekend of March 17, 1991.
Underwent shoulder surgery in July 1991 for the preexisting shoulder problems. Laid up until early 1992. However, these repeated shoulder problems caused him to go into semi retirement.

Racing habits and traits
Very outspoken personality. By all accounts having an intense personality. Had a bit of a temper on the track which was an indication of his intensity. Could be abrupt with fans. Over the years it was often repeated by the BMX press that a "new" more mellow and relaxed Greg Hill has emerged. For instance the "Maturing Greg Hill" in the November 1983 issue of Super BMX only to have the old intensity display itself. It is also regarded widely that it is this intensity and seriousness he brought to racing is what kept him on or near the top so long.

Miscellaneous
His pants motto* was: "You Loze"

*Riders often put slogans on the seat of their pants instead of their surname as a small psychological ploy against their competitors behind them to read.

Post BMX career
After a four-year hiatus Greg Hill began racing in the Veteran's Pro class of the ABA in 2004. He owned his own BMX bicycle company, Greg Hill Products, which closed in 2017. He is still involved with teaching BMX racing at Pro clinics he runs.

Notes

External links
 Greg Hill Speed Seminar site
 

1963 births
Living people
American male cyclists
BMX riders